Aleksandar "Aco" Petrović (14 October 1959 – 1 December 2014) was a Serbian basketball coach.

Career 
Petrović started his coaching career in Radnički Belgrade, where he spent four years. After that, he was assistant coach of the Crvena zvezda and won the 1997–98 Yugoslavia championship. He also led the FMP Železnik and Hemofarm Vršac from domestic clubs.

The first foreign engagement was in Russia in the team Lokomotiv Rostov, and with them he came to the final of 2005 FIBA Europe Conference North. Also, Petrović has led more than foreign clubs UNICS, Žalgiris and Azovmash.

National team 
Petrović was an assistant coach of Svetislav Pešić in the national team of Yugoslavia, with whom he won gold at the 2001 European Championships in Turkey and, a year later, at the World Championships in Indianapolis. He also has a silver medal from the 2009 European Championships in Poland when he was in the coaching staff of Dušan Ivković.

Illness and death 
During his work at the club UNICS it was detected the disease amyotrophic lateral sclerosis, and Petović stopped coaching after that. Last UNICS game led by him was against his former club Crvena zvezda in the 2012–13 Eurocup. He died on 1 December 2014 at the age of 55.

References

1959 births
2014 deaths
Deaths from motor neuron disease
BC UNICS coaches
BC Žalgiris coaches
KK Crvena zvezda head coaches
KK Crvena zvezda assistant coaches
KK FMP (1991–2011) coaches
KK Beovuk 72 coaches
BKK Radnički coaches
Serbian expatriate basketball people in Russia
Serbian expatriate basketball people in Ukraine
Serbian expatriate basketball people in Lithuania
Serbian men's basketball coaches
PBC Lokomotiv-Kuban coaches
People from Požega, Serbia